is a 2020 Japanese drama film directed by Eiji Uchida, who also wrote the screenplay. It received nine nominations at the 44th Japan Academy Film Prize, including Director of the Year and Screenplay of the Year, winning for Picture of the Year, Outstanding Performance by an Actor in a Leading Role, and Newcomer of the Year.

Plot 

Nagisa is a transgender woman. Growing up as a man in Hiroshima, Nagisa faces prejudice and is ostracized by the society. She leaves Hiroshima and lives in Tokyo where she works as a dancer in a nightclub. Her distant niece, Ichika is a middle school student neglected by her mother. After being kicked out of her home, Ichika travels to Tokyo and starts living with Nagisa. Although initially reluctant, Nagisa takes care of Ichika and starts to develop maternal feelings for her for the first time.

Cast

Reception

Writing for The Japan Times, Mark Schilling gave the movie a positive review, calling it "a gloomy drama, with moments of realism and grace". Matthew Hernon of the same publication praised the portrayal of transgender issues and individualism through dance.

Accolades

References

External links
 

2020 films
2020 LGBT-related films
Japanese drama films
Japanese LGBT-related films
Films set in Tokyo
Picture of the Year Japan Academy Prize winners
2020 drama films
Transgender-related films